The 2009–10 season was Brisbane Roar's fifth season in the A-League. For the first time, Brisbane Roar was not be the sole representative from the state of Queensland, being joined by Gold Coast United and North Queensland Fury. The addition of the new clubs and a change of ownership of the Roar have led to the club changing its name from Queensland Roar to Brisbane Roar. The change of ownership also brought about notable changes in the clubs' administrative ranks. Peter McLennan became CEO in place of the retiring Lawrence Oudendyk, while Chris Bombolas took the role of club chairman in June, which had been vacant since the departure of John Ribot in March 2008. Brisbane Roars owners increased membership and ticket prices leading to a decrease in crowd figures for the 2009–10 A-league season.

Managers
 Frank Farina – (Suspended on 10 October 2009. Sacked on 14 October 2009)
 Rado Vidosic – (10 October 2009 – 15 October 2009; caretaker)
 Ange Postecoglou – (16 October 2009 – 3 May 2012)

Squad lineup for 2009/10

Transfers

Injury replacement players used 
The following players were signed by the club to cover for long term injuries and players unavailable to International commitments (such as the 2009 FIFA U-20 World Cup).
 Robbie Kruse – Signed to cover for injury to Massimo Murdocca (Signed for Melbourne Victory.)
 Ivan Franjic – Signed to cover for loss of Luke DeVere to 2009 FIFA U-20 World Cup. Upon DeVere's return, Franjic was instilled as the injury replacement player for Henrique
 Calum O'Connell – Signed to cover injury to Andrew Packer
 Mario Karlovic – Signed to cover for injury to Massimo Murdocca following the departure of Kruse.
 Vedran Janjetović – Signed to cover injury to Liam Reddy

Pre-season 
After last years initial success, the Roar Roadshow continues with fan days and trial matches against various clubs in the Brisbane area. However, drought-breaking rains in the South East took their toll, with multiple games cancelled or postponed due to waterlogged pitches. 
Queensland Roars Against Racism again, with Scottish giants Celtic F.C. becoming the highest profile club to ever challenge for the international invitational Translink Cup.
The A-League Pre-Season Challenge Cup has been abolished, allowing A-League clubs to organize their own pre-season fixtures with one another.

2009–10 Hyundai A-League

Goalscorers

Squad statistics

Statistics accurate as of match played 11 October 2009. Some stats not available on Roar website.

Players with a * next to their number have all been released from the club

Ladder

References 

2009-10
2009–10 A-League season by team